Psalter Pahlavi is a Unicode block containing characters for writing Middle Persian.  The script derives its name from the "Pahlavi Psalter", a 6th- or 7th-century translation of a Syriac book of psalms.

History
The following Unicode-related documents record the purpose and process of defining specific characters in the Psalter Pahlavi block:

References 

Unicode blocks